The Curuaés River is a river of Pará state in north-central Brazil. It is a right tributary of the Curuá River in the Xingu River basin.

The river rises in the  Nascentes da Serra do Cachimbo Biological Reserve, a strictly protected conservation unit established in 2005. It is one of the headwaters of the Xingu River.
It flows through the  Altamira National Forest, a sustainable use conservation unit created in 1998.

See also
List of rivers of Pará

References

Brazilian Ministry of Transport

Rivers of Pará